Hachée is a traditional Dutch stew based on diced meat, fish or poultry, and vegetables. Hachee based on beef, onions, apple butter, breakfast bread and acid (usually vinegar or wine) is a typical example of traditional Dutch cuisine. Clove and bay leaves are added to the thick gravy. It is usually served with potatoes. Dutch people may occasionally combine hachee with hutspot.

Origin
The word hachée in French means chopped or ground, being the past participle of the verb hacher -- to chop or grind. Hachées have been described in Medieval buffets, although the exact recipe usually is not described. The stew probably has its origin in the reuse of meat cooked in a Dutch oven together with vegetables that happened to be available. Wine or vinegar were added to make the meat more tender.

See also
 List of stews
 Sauerbraten

References

Dutch cuisine
Meat stews
Beef dishes